Owen MacEoin Dubh MacAlister was a son of Alasdair MacEoin Dubh MacAlister, 1st of Loup, Chief of Clan MacAlister. He was killed in battle in Antrim, Ireland in 1571.

Biography
Became Chief of Clan MacAlister, 2nd of Loup, upon the death of his father. Owen was an esteemed galloglass warrior, more esteemed than Sorley Boy MacDonnell. As a reward for his and his warriors service and loyalty to the MacDonnell clan in Antrim, Ireland, Sorley Boy MacDonnell gifted Kinbane Castle to him. Owen was killed in 1571 during a skirmish with the Carrickfergus garrison, fighting alongside Sorley Boy.

References

External links
Annals of the Four Masters Vol. 5 (AD 1501-1588): gaelic edition and translation

1571 deaths
Owen
People from Argyll and Bute
Year of birth unknown